Cauldron Snout is a cascade on the upper reaches of the River Tees in Northern England, immediately below the dam of the Cow Green Reservoir. It is well upstream of the High Force waterfall, and is on the boundary between County Durham and Cumbria (historically Westmorland), England. The waterfall lies within the North Pennines Area of Outstanding Natural Beauty (AONB) and European Geopark.

It is impressive by the scale of the British landscape, and attracts a lot of visitors, despite the  walk from the nearest car park (at Cow Green Reservoir). No fee is payable . The Pennine Way takes in Cauldron Snout.

The falls are caused by the upper Tees passing over dolerite steps of the Whin Sill.

In Art and Literature
An engraving of a painting of the cataract by Thomas Allom was published in Fisher's Drawing Room Scrap Book, 1835 with a poetical illustration thereon by Letitia Elizabeth Landon,

References

External links 

 Moor House Upper Teesdale National Nature Reserve
 Explore North Pennines - Teesdale
 
 Walk to Cauldron Snout

WCauldronSnout
Landforms of County Durham
Landforms of Cumbria
Waterfalls of England
Tourist attractions in County Durham
Tourist attractions in Cumbria
Dufton